Santiago (English: Saint James) is a former civil parish (freguesia) in the city and municipality of Lisbon, Portugal. It had a total area of 0.06 km2 and total population of 846 inhabitants (2009); density: 13,823 inhabitants/km2. At the administrative reorganization of Lisbon on 8 December 2012 it became part of the parish Santa Maria Maior.

Main sites
Santa Luzia Church
Santiago Church
Menino de Deus Church
Museu de Artes Decorativas - Fundação Ricardo do Espírito Santo
Roman Theatre Museum
Belmonte Palace
Pátio D. Fradique

External links
 17th and 18th Santiago's demographic study made by Lisbon's Câmara Municipal

References 

Former parishes of Lisbon